11th National Board of Review Awards
December 24, 1939
The 11th National Board of Review Awards were announced on 24 December 1939.

Best American Films
Confessions of a Nazi Spy
Wuthering Heights
Stagecoach
Ninotchka
Young Mr. Lincoln
Crisis
Goodbye, Mr. Chips
Mr. Smith Goes to Washington
The Roaring Twenties
U-Boat 29

Top Foreign Films 
Port of Shadows
Harvest
Alexander Nevsky
The End of the Day
Robert Koch

Winners
Best American Film: Confessions of a Nazi Spy
Best Foreign Film: Le quai des brumes (Port of Shadows), France
Best Acting:
James Cagney - The Roaring Twenties
Bette Davis - Dark Victory and The Old Maid
Geraldine Fitzgerald - Dark Victory and Wuthering Heights
Henry Fonda - Young Mr. Lincoln
Jean Gabin - Le quai des brumes (Port of Shadows)
Greta Garbo - Ninotchka
Francis Lederer - Confessions of a Nazi Spy
Paul Lukas - Confessions of a Nazi Spy
Thomas Mitchell - Stagecoach
Laurence Olivier - Wuthering Heights
Flora Robson - We Are Not Alone
Michel Simon - Le quai des brumes (Port of Shadows) and The End of the Day

Notes

External links
National Board of Review of Motion Pictures :: Awards for 1939

1939
1939 film awards
1939 in American cinema